Michał Bartczak (born 27 February 1987) is a Polish handball player for the Polish national team. He is currently a free agent.

He participated at the 2013 World Men's Handball Championship.

References

1987 births
Living people
People from Pabianice
Polish male handball players
Vive Kielce players
21st-century Polish people